Seven Sundays may refer to:

 Seven Sundays (1994 film), a French-Italian comedy film
 Seven Sundays (2017 film), a Filipino comedy-drama film